usually refers to the Nihon SF Taisho Award, an annual Japanese science fiction award given by the Science Fiction and Fantasy Writers of Japan.

It may also refer to:
Japan Booksellers' Award, or Hon'ya Taishō, an annual Japanese literary award given by bookstore clerks throughout Japan
Manga Taishō, an annual Japanese manga award
Animax Taishō, an annual anime scriptwriting competition organized by the Japanese anime satellite television network, Animax